Randall C. Garrison  (born August 27, 1951) is a Canadian politician. Elected to the House of Commons in the 2011 federal election, he represents the electoral district of Esquimalt—Saanich—Sooke and is a member of the New Democratic Party. He serves as the party's critic for lesbian, gay, bisexual, and transgender issues, succeeding former MP Bill Siksay, and for National Defence. Since becoming an MP, he has introduced legislation to amend the Canadian Human Rights Act and the Criminal Code, return federal environmental protection to the Goldstream River, and lobbied the government to implement an action plan concerning the endangered Southern resident killer whales. A former criminology and political science instructor at Camosun College, Garrison is openly gay and lives in Esquimalt, British Columbia, with his partner, Teddy Pardede.

Garrison previously stood for election in the 2004 and 2006 federal elections, both times as the NDP candidate in the Esquimalt—Juan de Fuca riding and both times narrowly losing to incumbent MP Keith Martin. He lived in Vancouver for a short time, during which he was nominated to be the NDP candidate in the Vancouver Centre riding during the 2008 federal election before dropping out for "personal and professional reasons". After moving back to Esquimalt he was elected to the Esquimalt City Council for a three-year term starting in November 2008.

Garrison has served on the boards of several non-profit organizations as well as the Esquimalt Police Board. He is also an international human rights activist. He has worked as a policing researcher in Afghanistan with Amnesty International, on a Christian-Muslim peace building project in Indonesia for the International Catholic Migration Commission, and as co-coordinator of IFET, an international non-government human rights observer mission for the East Timor independence referendum in 1999. In May 2010, Garrison served as an international observer with the People's International Observers Mission (PIOM) in the Autonomous Region of Muslim Mindanao for the national elections in the Philippines.

Background
Born in Nebraska, Randall Garrison eventually moved to Canada in 1973. He spent two years living in Yellowknife, working for the government recording vital statistics. He moved to British Columbia where, at the age of 26, Garrison graduated from the University of British Columbia with a master's degree in political science. He moved to Victoria where he worked within the B.C. provincial government as a public policy researcher and director. By the 1990s, and until he was elected as  a Member of Parliament, he taught at Camosun College, in criminal justice, political science, and Pacific Rim studies. In 1990, as  a member of the Victoria Civic Electors, Garrison ran for Victoria City Council, but did not win a seat. At the time he was president of the Vic West Community Association and executive director of the South Pacific People's Foundation of Canada. In 1999, Garrison helped coordinate the International Federation for East Timor who acted as neutral election observer during the East Timorese independence referendum. Garrison's other work overseas included peace-building between religious groups in Indonesia and investigating human rights issues in Afghanistan. Back in Canada, Garrison became a member of the Victoria and Esquimalt police board. During this time, Garrison also helped co-found the Victoria Immigrant and Refugee Centre.

In the 2004 federal election, the 53-year-old Garrison became the New Democratic Party candidate in the Esquimalt—Juan de Fuca riding. The election was seen as a three-way race between Garrison, the Liberal Party incumbent Keith Martin and Conservative Party candidate and former Martin aide John Koury. Garrison placed second, 4.6% behind Martin who was re-elected to a fourth term. A year-and-a-half later, with another federal election expected soon, Garrison was acclaimed the NDP candidate, and again faced Martin, but this time the Conservative challenger was lawyer Troy DeSouza. This January 2006 election was again considered a toss-up and as a result CBC Radio One's Cross Country Checkup broadcast a show highlighting the riding and the candidates. However, Garrison again lost to Martin, this time by 3.6%. Subsequently, Garrison and his partner moved to Vancouver's West End where, in January 2007, he was acclaimed the NDP candidate in the Vancouver Centre riding for an expected election. The next election did not occur until October 2008 and by that time Garrison had moved back to Esquimalt and withdrew from the Vancouver Centre election.

Instead, Garrison stood in the November 2008 local government election where he won a seat on the Esquimalt municipal council. On local issues Garrison was critical of police budget request increases of 10% in 2009 and 5% in 2010 and argued that Esquimalt's merger of its police force with the Victoria Police Department was not producing the benefits that were promised and costing the municipality more than it should.  The council adopted a resolution, proposed by Garrison to fund the full budget requests of the police minus one dollar.  Garrison advocated for stricter targets of greenhouse gas emissions reduction, and passed a motion supporting a permanent ban on coastal drilling and tanker traffic in BC waters. Garrison lobbied to get the municipality to adopt a living wage policy.  At the time a living wage in Greater Victoria was calculated to be $17.31 per hour for a full-time worker. The council adopted the proposal in principle, but ultimately approved a policy that only applied to limit situations.

Federal politics
In January 2011, Garrison was again acclaimed as the NDP candidate in the Esquimalt—Juan de Fuca riding.  With Liberal MP Keith Martin no longer seeking re-election, the riding was seen as a potential win for the party. The election came in the spring 2011 and other candidates included home-maker Shaunna Salsman for the Green Party, Canadian Action Party leader Christopher Porter and independent Louis Lesosky, as well as Langford councillor Lillian Szpak for the Liberal Party. Garrison campaigned on supporting development of light rail and  universal child care. He was endorsed by the Conservation Voters of British Columbia. The Conservative Party candidate, Troy DeSouza, was supported by party leader and Prime Minister, Stephen Harper, who visited the riding early in the election campaign. Garrison won the riding over DeSouza by 0.6%, due to rising NDP support nationwide and significant votes from Saanich and Esquimalt, thereby joining the official opposition caucus, with the Conservative Party having won a majority government.

41st Parliament
As the 41st Parliament opened, Garrison was appointed to the Standing Committee on Public Safety and National Security and party leader Jack Layton appointed Garrison as the NDP critic on LGBT issues. During the 2012 New Democratic Party leadership election, following the death of Jack Layton, Garrison supported Peggy Nash, saying she "embodies the NDP values of social justice, environmental sustainability and prosperity for all". Following Nash's defeat on the second ballot of the contest, he supported Thomas Mulcair, the eventual winner. Mulcair added public safety to Garrison's critic duties.

Following the election, fellow British Columbian NDP MP Jean Crowder was appointed his political mentor. While Garrison and Crowder shared an office in Ottawa, Garrison opened his constituency office in View Royal.  Locally, Garrison joined with fellow NDP MP Denise Savoie, provincial Member of the Legislative Assembly Rob Fleming, and local councillors, and the Greater Victoria Chamber of Commerce to advocate for federal and provincial funds to develop a light rail transportation system from Victoria to Langford, a system which had already had commitment from Victoria Regional Transit Commission, the Capital Regional District and the BC Transit. Garrison also successfully fought the attempted deportation of a constituent through a public campaign to the Minister of Citizenship and Immigration Jason Kenney.

As the NDP's LGBT critic, Garrison introduced a piece of legislation, An Act to amend the Canadian Human Rights Act and the Criminal Code (gender identity and gender expression) (Bill C-279) which include gender identity and gender expression among the characteristics protected from discrimination and eligible to be considered in sentencing crimes motivated by hate. Similar legislation had been introduced by Bill Siksay in the 38th, 39th and 40th Parliaments. The bill was amended by the House of Commons to remove the term 'gender expression' and sent to the Senate where it died on the order paper. He also spoke at a remembrance ceremony for a teenager who had committed suicide due to bullying concerning his sexual orientation. After Conservative Party MPs made an 'It Gets Better' video in response to the bullied teenager, a video which received independent criticism regarding its hypocrisy (the MPs had previously voted against same-sex marriage legislation) Garrison explained that, while well-intentioned, they were just repeating a slogan and did not understand the concept.

Garrison introduced Bill C-509, "An Act to amend the Navigable Waters Protection Act (Goldstream River)"  in October 2013. The legislation aims to return federal oversight to the "ecological and culturally significant river". Garrison also introduced a motion (M-460) to implement an action plan
via the federal government to save the remaining Southern resident killer whales.

42nd Parliament
Garrison stood for re-election in the 2015 election. Challenging him in the Esquimalt—Saanich—Sooke riding was government lawyer David Merner for the Liberal Party, Colwood councillor Shari Lukens for the Conservative Party, small-business owner Frances Litman for the Green Party, and student Tyson Strandlund for the Communist Party. Garrison held the riding for the NDP but the party fell to third party status for the 42nd Parliament.

Party leader Thomas Mulcair appointed Garrison to be the critic for national defence and LGBT issues. After Mulcair's resignation as leader, Garrison endorsed Jagmeet Singh in the NDP leadership election. Following Singh's victory, he kept Garrison critic role the same. In December 2015, Garrison again introduced the private member bill An Act to amend the Canadian Human Rights Act and the Criminal Code (gender identity and gender expression) (Bill C-204). While Bill C-204 did not advance beyond that, its contents were finally adopted in the Minister of Justice's Bill C-16.

Electoral record

References

External links 
 
Randall Garrison - House of Commons biography
 Randall Garrison - New Democratic Member of Parliament (Esquimalt—Juan de Fuca)

American emigrants to Canada
Members of the House of Commons of Canada from British Columbia
New Democratic Party MPs
Gay politicians
Canadian LGBT Members of Parliament
Living people
British Columbia municipal councillors
People from Esquimalt, British Columbia
Politicians from Lincoln, Nebraska
Canadian criminologists
1951 births
LGBT municipal councillors in Canada
University of British Columbia alumni
21st-century Canadian politicians
Canadian LGBT rights activists
21st-century Canadian LGBT people
Canadian gay men